MP10, MP 10, or MP-10 may refer to:

 MP 10, a zone during the Eocene epoch
 Mario Party 10, a 2015 Wii U video game
 Heckler & Koch MP5/10, an MP5 submachine gun clone